Bear Creek is the name of at least 123 streams in the U.S. state of Oregon, making it the most popular name for a stream in Oregon (followed by "Dry Creek" with 84 entries). Bear Creek may refer to:

References 

Rivers of Oregon